Hermann Otto Hettner (born 27 January 1875, Dresden; d. 19 April 1931, Dresden) was a German painter, illustrator, engraver, and sculptor, and a professor at the Dresden Academy of Fine Arts.

Life

Otto Hettner was the son of the literary historian Hermann Theodor Hettner (1821–1882) and Anna Hettner (1838–1897), the oldest daughter of German painter August Grahl.

At the turn of the century, between 1897 and 1904, Hettner studied at the Academy of Fine Arts, Karlsruhe, with Robert Pötzelberger, and at the Académie Julian in Paris.

From 1904 to 1911, Hettner lived in Florence, where Jeanne Alexandrine Thibert (1878–1958) gave birth to his son Roland Hettner (1905–1978) on 26 October 1905. Roland later worked as an illustrator. In May 1907, Otto Hettner married Jeanne Thibert (1878–1958), a French woman, in London. Shortly thereafter, their daughter Sabine Hettner was born. As an adult, Sabine became a noted painter of landscapes and portraits.

With his family, Hettner returned to Dresden in 1913 and studied at the Dresden Academy of Fine Arts. In 1916 he became a member of the executive committee of the Free Secession, and the next year he became the director of the Dresden Academy of Fine Arts, where he worked as a professor and president from 1918 to 1927.

Hettner illustrated various books for renowned publishers of the time, including Avalun-Verlag, Marees-Gesellschaft, and Pan-Presse. Among his lithographic works are Hugo von Hofmannsthal’s Florindo and Miguel de Cervantes’s La Galatea (Avalun-Verlag) and Heinrich von Kleist’s The Earthquake in Chile (Pan-Presse).<ref>{{cite book|last1=Hiebler|first1=Heinz|title=Hugo von Hofmannsthal und die Medienkultur der Moderne|url=https://archive.org/details/hugovonhofmannst0000hieb|url-access=registration|date=2003|location=Würzburg|isbn=9783826023408}}</ref>

Notable works
 Hofmannsthal, Hugo von. Florindo.  Vienna: Avalun-Verlag, 1923. (illustrated by Hettner)
 Longus. Daphnis und Chloe. '' Munich: Buchenau & Reichert, 1923. (illustrated by Hettner)

External links
 Otto Hettner’s works at the Fine Art Museums of San Francisco (FAMSF)
 Otto Hettner’s works at the Los Angeles County Museum of Art (LACMA)
 Otto Hettner’s works at the Museum of Modern Art (MoMA)
 Otto Hettner’s works on Wikimedia Commons

Further reading
 Caspers, Eva. Paul Cassirer und die Pan-Presse : Ein Beitrag zur deutschen Buchillustration und Graphik im 20. Jahrhundert. Berlin/Boston: De Gruyter, 1989.
 “Hettner, Otto.” Benezit Dictionary of Artists. Accessed May 3, 2017. 
 “Hettner, Sabine.” Benezit Dictionary of Artists. Accessed May 3, 2017. 
 Löffler, Fritz. “Hettner, Otto.” Neue Deutsche Biographie, Volume 9. Berlin: Duncker & Humblot, 1972.
 Schenkenberg, Tamara. “‘Kriegszeit’ and ‘Der Bildermann,’ agents of German Kultur: Paul Cassirer's flying pages during the First World War.” PhD diss, 2014.

References

1875 births
1931 deaths
German Expressionist painters
Modern painters
20th-century German painters
20th-century German male artists
German male painters
Académie Julian alumni
Academic staff of the Dresden Academy of Fine Arts